Paul Xavier Gleason (May 4, 1939 – May 27, 2006) was an American film and television actor.  He was known for his roles on television series such as All My Children and films such as The Breakfast Club, Trading Places, and Die Hard.

Early life
Gleason was born on May 4, 1939, in Jersey City, New Jersey, the son of Eleanor (née Doyle), a registered nurse, and George L. Gleason, a restaurateur, professional boxer, iron worker, and roofing manufacturer. Gleason was raised in Miami Beach, Florida. At age 16, he ran away from home and hitchhiked across the east coast, sleeping on beaches and playing baseball. He attended North Miami High School and Florida State University, where he played football. He signed a professional baseball contract with the Cleveland Indians, but played just briefly in two minor league seasons between 1959 and 1960.

During that last season, a West Coast trip led to an introduction to sitcom icon Ozzie Nelson, which, in turn, led to an appearance on Ozzie and Harriet (as per Nelson's habit of hiring athletes for guest spots on the show). Suddenly, acting was an option, and an increasingly attractive one, given Gleason's stillborn baseball career. He moved to New York City, eventually joining The Actors Studio, where he would study for four years before moving to Los Angeles.

Career
Gleason starred in many movies, and became well-known initially as Dr. David Thornton on All My Children, playing the role from 1976 to 1978. He guest-starred in "The Trouble with Harry" and "Fire", two episodes of The A-Team. Gleason was known to Star Wars fans for his role as Jeremitt Towani in the 1985 made-for-TV film Ewoks: The Battle for Endor. He played the villainous Clarence Beeks, the Duke brothers' security consultant, in the 1983 comedy Trading Places starring Dan Aykroyd and Eddie Murphy. He also played Deputy Police Chief Dwayne T. Robinson, the blowhard police official, in Die Hard.

At 44, Gleason played Richard Vernon, the disciplinarian high school vice principal, in the 1985 film The Breakfast Club. He played similar characters in the 1988 film Johnny Be Good (as a high school football coach) and on several episodes of the TV sitcom Boy Meets World (as a university dean). He directly parodied his Breakfast Club role in the 2000 A-Teens music video for "Dancing Queen" and in the 2001 comedy film Not Another Teen Movie.

In 2002, Gleason appeared in episodes of Dawson's Creek as Larry Newman, the sex-and-violence obsessed chief of a B movie studio. He appeared as a nonsensical judge in an episode of Drake & Josh, as well as in an episode of George Lopez as the brother of George's boss, a crazy old drunk. In 2005, he appeared as the Sheriff in the horror film Abominable.  His final appearance before his death was in an independent film called The Book of Caleb.

Gleason also made a guest appearance on Friends as Jack, Phoebe's boss at an investment company, in the season 6 episode "The One That Could Have Been".

Personal life 
Gleason, in addition to his acting career, participated in many celebrity charity golf events each year, and was known to mingle with fans and sign autographs during these golf tournaments.

From 1971 to 1978, he was married to actress Candy Moore; they had one daughter, Shannon. From 1995 until his death, he was married to Susan Kehl; they had one daughter, Kaitlin.

Death
Gleason died on May 27, 2006, at a Burbank, California, hospital from pleural mesothelioma, a form of lung cancer connected with asbestos, which he is thought to have contracted from asbestos exposure on building sites while working for his father as a teenager. Gleason was 67 years old. He is buried near the southeast corner of the Westwood Village Memorial Park Cemetery in Westwood, Los Angeles.

Filmography

References

Further reading
 Voisin, Scott, "Character Kings: Hollywood's Familiar Faces Discuss the Art & Business of Acting." BearManor Media, 2009. .

External links
 
 
 
 Career statistics and player information from Baseball-Reference
 

1939 births
2006 deaths
20th-century American male actors
21st-century American male actors
American male film actors
American male soap opera actors
American male television actors
Deaths from cancer in California
Deaths from mesothelioma
Florida State Seminoles football players
Florida State University alumni
Male actors from Jersey City, New Jersey
Male actors from Miami
Minor league baseball players
Selma Cloverleafs players
Wytheville Senators players
Burials at Westwood Village Memorial Park Cemetery